"Lions in the Wild" is a song recorded by Dutch DJ and record producer Martin Garrix and British DJ and production duo Third Party. It features the uncredited vocals of British singer Max McElligott, formerly of the group Wolf Gang. It was released on streaming services after he premiered the song at Ultra Music Festival 2016 on 27 May 2016.

Background and composition 
"Lions in the Wild" features "a melodic synth-driven drop and dramatic snare-stuttered builds". This collaboration with British DJs Third Party was premiered by Garrix at the Ultra Music Festival 2016 as his opening song. It is his second single since launching the record label Stmpd Rcrds.

Music video 
The music video, which was filmed in Africa and Thailand, was uploaded on Martin Garrix's official YouTube channel. As of 13 October 2016, the video has over 16 million views. The video begins with Giaro Giarratana, the director and producer of the music video, driving by a desert where he stopped to stroll around. He then moves on to climb rocks before riding a desert buggy through the desert. The video concludes with Giaro visiting the local community before riding a dirt bike through rocky mountains.

Charts

Weekly charts

Year-end charts

References 

2016 songs
2016 singles
Martin Garrix songs
Songs written by Martin Garrix
Stmpd Rcrds singles